Eduardo Amorim may refer to:

 Eduardo Amorim (footballer) (born 1950), Brazilian football manager and footballer
 Eduardo Amorim (politician) (born 1963), Brazilian politician

See also
 Eduarda Amorim (born 1986), Brazilian handball player